Izatha churtoni is a moth of the family Oecophoridae. It is endemic to New Zealand, where it is widespread in the North Island.

The wingspan is 18–31.5 mm for males and 24.5–30 mm for females. Adults are on wing from October to February.

Larvae have been recorded in dead branches of Coriaria arborea. One specimen was reared from a larva in
dead Fuchsia excorticata. Further rearing records are from dead wood of Alnus rubra, Quercus species and Pittosporum tenuifolium.

References

Oecophorinae
Taxa named by John Stewart Dugdale
Endemic fauna of New Zealand
Endemic moths of New Zealand